Abiyev is an Azerbaijani surname. Notable people with the surname include:

Jeyhun Abiyev (born 1974), Azerbaijani boxer
Marat Abiyev (born 1989), Kazakh businessman
Safar Abiyev (born 1950), Azerbaijani general and politician

Azerbaijani-language surnames